Vojsko ( or ) is a  settlement next to Skaručna in the Municipality of Vodice in the Upper Carniola region of Slovenia. It lies at the southwest end of the Skaručna Basin.

References

External links

Vojsko on Geopedia

Populated places in the Municipality of Vodice